Inodrillia miamia is a species of sea snail, a marine gastropod mollusk in the family Horaiclavidae.

It was previously included within the family Turridae.

Description
The length of the shell attains 14.5 mm.

Distribution
This marine species occurs off East Florida, USA, at depths between 42 and 229 m.

References

External links
  Tucker, J.K. 2004 Catalog of recent and fossil turrids (Mollusca: Gastropoda). Zootaxa 682:1–1295.

miamia